"Eternal Flame" is a song by American pop rock group the Bangles for their third studio album, Everything (1988). The power ballad was written by group member Susanna Hoffs with the established hit songwriting team of Billy Steinberg and Tom Kelly. Upon its 1989 single release, "Eternal Flame" became a number-one hit in nine countries, including Australia, Sweden, the United Kingdom, and the United States. Since its release, it has been covered by many musical artists, including Australian boy band Human Nature, who reached the Australian top 10 with their version, and British girl group Atomic Kitten, who topped four national charts with their rendition.

Production
Two of the song's three writers, Tom Kelly and Susanna Hoffs, had met via the Bangles' October 30, 1986, concert at the Avalon Hollywood (then the Palace). Kelly attended the concert and backstage met the group's members. This led to Hoffs writing songs with Kelly and his regular songwriting partner Billy Steinberg, an experience she found interesting contrast to her usual songwriting habits. Hoffs would develop lyrics based on a melody she worked out while playing around with a guitar, while Kelly and Steinberg would start with a lyrical idea and write music to fit it. The trio's first composition to be recorded was "I Need a Disguise", which Belinda Carlisle recorded for her 1986 solo debut album. The Bangles' 1988 album Everything would feature two Hoffs/Kelly/Steinberg compositions, both with lead vocals by Hoffs: the upbeat lead single "In Your Room" and "Eternal Flame".

The focal metaphor of "Eternal Flame" was suggested by two eternal flames: one at the gravesite of Elvis Presley at Graceland, where the Bangles had been given a private tour. Hoffs said, "we were taken out to the Garden of Memories, and there was this little box which was supposed to have a lit flame in it, an eternal flame. Actually, that day it was raining so the flame was not on"—and one at a local synagogue in Palm Springs which Steinberg attended as a child. Steinberg explained, "Susanna was talking about the Bangles having visited Graceland, and she said there was some type of shrine to Elvis that included some kind of eternal flame. As soon as those words were mentioned, I immediately thought of the synagogue in the town of Palm Springs, California where I grew up. I remember during our Sunday school class they would walk us through the sanctuary. There was one little red light and they told us it was called the eternal flame."

After Steinberg suggested writing a song titled "Eternal Flame", he and Hoffs wrote the song's lyrics at Steinberg's house and then according to Hoffs brought the lyrics to Tom Kelly's studio where Kelly completed the music and the demo was cut. Steinberg recalls Kelly also being at Steinberg's house when the lyrics were written, beginning the music's composition there. "'Eternal Flame' was retro in that it has no chorus", Steinberg observed in 2021. Like the Beatles' "We Can Work It Out", it instead has a middle eight, the portion beginning "Say my name / Sun shines through the rain", that it repeats twice. And like the Beatles song, both verses end on the song's title. "In the 60s, it wasn't that unusual to have songs structured in that way, but, by the 80s, choruses were much more developed and middle eights had started to disappear", Steinberg recalls. While the final recording is a power ballad, the demo was deliberately guitar-oriented, despite sounding more suitable for a keyboard, as the Bangles had no keyboardist. When Hoffs played the demo at a band meeting where members and producer Davitt Sigerson decided what they would record for the upcoming album, it was rejected. Hoffs was "heartbroken" since she had been very enthusiastic about the song, but accepted her bandmates' decision.

During the sessions, Sigerson admitted to Hoffs that he could not get the demo out of his mind. He worked out an arrangement evoking a music box, bringing in keyboardist John Philip Shenale to give the track a chiming effect. According to Hoffs, Sigerson's production of the track was inspired by the vintage recordings of Patsy Cline which he knew Hoffs enjoyed singing along to. Hoffs would also recall that the Bangles' manager, Miles Copeland, overhearing the recording session for "Eternal Flame", had been displeased by the lack of drums and that Hoffs had to resist pressure to re-record it with a stronger beat. On the BBC program I'm in a Girl Group, Hoffs revealed she actually sang the studio recording of the song completely naked after Sigerson pranked her by telling her Olivia Newton-John recorded unclad (a falsehood Sigerson eventually admitted to). "I imagined it would feel like skinny dipping—vulnerable yet freeing – and I decided to try it", she remembered in 2021. Nobody could see me; there was a baffle in front of me and it was dark." She liked the experience enough to sing all her vocals on the album that way.

Critical reception
Considered by Billy Steinberg to be a stylistic fusion of the Byrds and the Beatles, especially evoking the latter group's "For No One", "Mother Nature's Son" (the bridge part) and  "Here There & Everywhere", "Eternal Flame" elicited different points of comparison from contemporary music critics, among them: "a backhanded tribute to every sappy string-drenched ballad—from Lulu's 'To Sir With Love' to Merrilee Rush's 'Angel of the Morning'—that ever overstayed its welcome on the radio"; "[a] fluffy romantic fantasy [that] resembled the Carpenters a lot more than the Beatles"; "a cloying ballad that Andrew Lloyd Webber could have written for Sarah Brightman"; "[On] 'Eternal Flame' Hoffs does her best inspired reading of Kate Bush". Pan-European magazine Music & Media commented that "this is a very sweet and conventional gospel-tinged ballad with the emphasis on close harmonies."

In 2000, Vicki Peterson of the Bangles would describe "Eternal Flame" as "a beautiful song [which] at the time I didn't think essentially Bangles. Anyone could've taken the song and made it a hit". The retrospective AllMusic critique by Matthew Greenwald assessed "Eternal Flame" as "somewhat removed from the Bangles' sound and vibe...[its] gentle, lilting melody...seems ready-made for an artist such as Anita Baker or Whitney Houston... The song features a dramatic bridge that takes the song to a wonderfully emotional place, and adds to the overall dynamics of the piece. In the end, ['Eternal Flame'] doesn't fit the Bangles' catalog well, but it remains a minor pop standard." In June 2021, Tom Eames of Smooth Radio ranked "Eternal Flame" as the Bangles' best song.

Single release

United States

Given that the Bangles' "Walk Like an Egyptian" had been ranked by Billboard as the number one single of 1987 and that the group had reached number two on the Billboard Hot 100 in 1986 with "Manic Monday" and in 1987 with "Hazy Shade of Winter", the number-five Hot 100 peak of the lead single from their album Everything, "In Your Room", was a comparative disappointment with its parent album Everything—whose original Billboard 200 peak was number 33—being considered a flop. The January 1989 release of "Eternal Flame" as the new Bangles' single was heralded in the Chicago Tribune with the song described as an "old-fashioned killer ballad that is just about as far as one could get from the psychedelic sound of the group's recent Top 5 hit 'In Your Room'." "Eternal Flame" debuted at number 56 on the Hot 100 issue dated February 4, 1989, when "In Your Room" was ranked at number 45, and rose to number one after ten weeks, making the Bangles the third all-female group to top the Hot 100 multiple times, after the Shirelles and the Supremes. In addition "Eternal Flame" set a record for the song's co-writers: Billy Steinberg and Tom Kelly, as the first songwriting team to score a number-one Hot 100 hit five years in a row. "Eternal Flame" also afforded the Bangles a two-week tenure at number one on the Adult Contemporary chart.

International
In the United Kingdom, where "In Your Room" had stalled at number 35, "Eternal Flame" was released on January 23, 1989, and made a rambling eight-week ascent into the top 40 of the UK Singles Chart before vaulting 20 positions to number 13 on the chart dated April 1, 1989. Two weeks later, on April 15, the single reached number one and remained there for three additional weeks. On June 17, 1989, when the song was at number 38 on the UK chart, it was deleted to clear the way for "Be with You", the third single released from Everything. Overall, "Eternal Flame" would be afforded a UK chart tenure of 20 weeks, ranking as the country's third-biggest hit of 1989. "Eternal Flame" spent three weeks at number one in Sweden and totaled 18 weeks on the Swedish Singles Chart, and it also spent seven weeks at number on the Dutch Top 40. The song was Australia's fourth-biggest-selling single of 1989, spending three non-consecutive weeks at number one, and was sent up on the Australian TV show Fast Forward.

Track listings

US 7-inch and cassette single
 "Eternal Flame" – 3:46
 "What I Meant to Say" – 3:20

UK and Australian 12-inch single
A1. "Eternal Flame" – 3:55
B1. "Walk Like an Egyptian" (12-inch dance mix) – 5:48
B2. "What I Meant to Say" – 3:20

UK cassette single
 "Eternal Flame"
 "Going Down to Liverpool"
 "Hero Takes a Fall"
 "James"

European 12-inch maxi-single
A1. "Eternal Flame" – 3:56
A2. "What I Meant to Say" – 3:20
B1. "Walk Like an Egyptian" (extended dance mix) – 5:48

Hong Kong mini-CD single
 "Eternal Flame" – 3:55
 "Manic Monday" – 3:04
 "Hazy Shade of Winter" – 2:48
 "Walk Like an Egyptian" – 3:23

Japanese mini-CD single
 "Eternal Flame (胸いっぱいの愛)"
 "Crash & Burn"

Personnel
Personnel are lifted from the US cassette single sleeve.
 Susanna Hoffs – writing
 Billy Steinberg – writing
 Tom Kelly – writing
 The Bangles – vocals
 Davitt Sigerson – production
 John Beverly Jones – recording
 Frank Filipetti – mixing

Charts

Weekly charts

Year-end charts

Certifications and sales

Aftermath
Rather than consolidating the Bangles' stardom, the success of "Eternal Flame" would have a negative impact on the group, underscoring the wide public perception of the Bangles as star attraction Hoffs and her backing band. The choice for the third single release from the Everything album being "Be with You", the group's first single led by Debbi Peterson since the band's second single release "Going Down to Liverpool" (1984), was an apparent attempt to redress the balance which failed, as "Be with You" would rise no higher than number 30 on the Hot 100 in the summer of 1989, when its UK chart peak would be number 23. The Bangles announced their disbanding the second week of October 1989.

Tomoya Nagase featuring 3T version

In 1997, a Japanese version of the song was recorded by Tomoya Nagase, the vocalist of the Japanese idol rock group Tokio, featuring 3T. This song was used as the theme song of the Nippon TV drama DXD, in which Nagase played the main role. He also wrote the Japanese version lyrics. This version was released as a single in Japan under the name of "Tomoya with 3T".

Human Nature version

In 1999, Australian group Human Nature covered "Eternal Flame" and released it as the fourth single from their second album Counting Down. It peaked at number eight on the ARIA Singles Chart and was certified gold.

Track listings
Australian enhanced CD single 1
 "Eternal Flame"
 "She's So Gone"
 "Breaking Me Down"
 "Don't Cry" (Discothèque Club remix)
 "Eternal Flame" (video clip)

Australian enhanced CD single 2
 "Eternal Flame"
 "Shake You Outta My Head"
 "She's So Gone"
 "Breaking Me Down"
 "Don't Cry" (Discothèque Club remix – 7-inch edit)
 "Eternal Flame" (video clip)

Credits and personnel
Credits are lifted from the Australian CD single liner notes.

Studios
 Recorded at Tiger Recording (Sydney, Australia)
 Mixed by Larrabee West Studio (Los Angeles, California, US)
 Mastered at Sony Music Studios (New York City, US)

Personnel
 Susanna Hoffs, Billy Steinberg, Tom Kelly – writing
 Human Nature – vocals
 Andrew Klippel – production
 David Hemming – recording
 Dave Way – mixing
 Vlado Meller – mastering

Charts

Weekly charts

Year-end charts

Certifications

Atomic Kitten version

English girl group Atomic Kitten subsequently recorded the song in 2001 and released it as the lead single from the reissue of their debut studio album, Right Now, on July 23, 2001. It was the group's first single to feature new band member Jenny Frost. Their version was produced by Andy Wright, and a music video directed by Phil Griffin was made for the song.

Critical reception
Lars Trillingsgaar, head of music for Danish radio station ANR Hit FM, said that Atomic Kitten's cover of "Eternal Flame" took the original "in a whole new direction", comparing it to another cover of a popular 1980s song that was released in 2001: "Another Day in Paradise" by siblings Brandy and Ray J, originally by Phil Collins. Trillingsgaar also noted that the cover had the ability to touch its listeners, much like the original had done.

Chart performance
Atomic Kitten's version was released on July 23, 2001; in Australia, it was issued alongside a re-release of the group's debut single, "Right Now" (1999). In the United Kingdom, it entered the UK Singles Chart at number one, selling 150,000 copies during its first week of release to beat out Destiny's Child's "Bootylicious", which debuted at number two with 56,000 copies sold. The Official Charts Company credits this result to "Bootylicious" having already been released on the parent album, Survivor, whereas the re-release of Right Now did not occur until after "Eternal Flame" had reached number one. It stayed at number one for two weeks and has sold 458,000 copies as of July 2022.

Outside the UK, the cover reached number one in the Flanders region of Belgium and in New Zealand, staying one week at the top in both regions. In France, Ireland, and Sweden, it reached number two, and it became a top-ten hit in Austria, Germany, Hungary, the Netherlands, Portugal, and Switzerland. It is certified gold in the UK, Belgium, France, New Zealand, and Sweden.

Track listings

European CD single
 "Eternal Flame" – 3:15
 "Dancing in the Street" – 3:39

European enhanced CD single
 "Eternal Flame" – 3:15
 "Album Medley" – 5:30
 "Eternal Flame" (Blacksmith RnB Rub) – 3:54
 "Eternal Flame" (video) – 3:10

European maxi-single
 "Eternal Flame" – 3:15
 "Album Medley" – 5:30
 "Eternal Flame" (Blacksmith RnB Rub) – 3:45

Canadian CD single
 "Eternal Flame" – 3:15
 "Megamix" – 6:00

Australian CD single
 "Right Now" – 3:35
 "Eternal Flame" – 3:15
 "Right Now" (K-Klass Phazerfunk club mix) – 7:22
 "Eternal Flame" (Blacksmith RnB dub) – 3:55
 "Eternal Flame" (video) – 3:10

Credits and personnel
Credits are lifted from the European enhanced CD single liner notes and Right Now album booklet.

Studio
 Recorded and mixed at Metropolis Studios (London, UK)

Personnel
 Susanna Hoffs, Tom Kelly, Billy Steinberg – writing
 Atomic Kitten – vocals
 Claudia Fontaine – additional backing vocals
 Geoff Holroyde, Paul Simm – additional musicians
 Andy Wright – production
 Pete Craigie – mixing
 Alan Douglas, James Brown – engineering
 Ned Douglas – additional programming

Charts

Weekly charts

Year-end charts

Certifications

Release history

References

External links
 The Bangles official website

1988 songs
1989 singles
1997 singles
1999 singles
2001 singles
3T songs
Atomic Kitten songs
The Bangles songs
Billboard Hot 100 number-one singles
Cashbox number-one singles
Columbia Records singles
Dutch Top 40 number-one singles
Human Nature (band) songs
Innocent Records singles
Irish Singles Chart number-one singles
Music videos directed by Tim Pope
Number-one singles in Australia
Number-one singles in New Zealand
Number-one singles in Norway
Number-one singles in Portugal
Number-one singles in Scotland
Number-one singles in Sweden
Pop ballads
Rock ballads
Songs written by Billy Steinberg
Songs written by Tom Kelly (musician)
Songs written by Susanna Hoffs
Sony Music Entertainment Japan singles
Torch songs
UK Singles Chart number-one singles
Ultratop 50 Singles (Flanders) number-one singles
Universal Music Japan singles
Virgin Records singles
1980s ballads